The Directors Guild of America (DGA) is an entertainment guild that represents the interests of film and television directors in the United States motion picture industry and abroad. Founded as the Screen Directors Guild in 1936, the group merged with the Radio and Television Directors Guild in 1960 to become the modern Directors Guild of America.

Overview

As a union that seeks to organize an individual profession, rather than multiple professions across an industry, the DGA is a craft union. It represents directors and members of the directorial team (assistant directors, unit production managers, stage managers, associate directors, production associates, and location managers (in New York and Chicago)); that representation includes all sorts of media, such as film, television, documentaries, news, sports, commercials and new media.

The guild has various training programs whereby successful applicants are placed in various productions and can gain experience working in the film or television industry.

, the guild had more than 18,000 members. The DGA headquarters are on Sunset Boulevard in Hollywood, with satellite offices in New York and Chicago and coordinating committees in San Francisco, Chicago, and London.

Composition
According to DGA's Department of Labor records, the guild's reported membership classifications currently account for 1,532 "retirees" (about 10% of total membership), 323 "suspended" members (2%), and 5 "life" members (<1%), compared to 13,577 "active" members. "Suspended" members pay dues but are ineligible to vote in the union. DGA contracts also cover some non-members, known as agency fee payers. These non-members currently number 172, or about 1% of the size of the union's membership.

Membership
The DGA site lists the following for membership:

Membership categories are:
Director: Feature/Television
Director: Commercial, Documentary, Low Budget Feature, Staff, Segment
Unit Production Manager
1st Assistant Director
2nd Assistant Director
AD/UPM Low Budget
Associate Director
Stage Manager
AD/SM Low Budget
Production Associate (West)
Program Production Assistant (East)

Membership initiation fees in 2022 ranged from $200 for a Production Associate to $13,416 for a feature director.

The DGA site listed the following for dues in 2022:

Labor agreements
The agreements signed between the guild and film and television production companies make various stipulations covering pay and working conditions for guild members and require that all those employed in the relevant fields on a film made by that company are guild members. Guild members are generally prevented from working for companies that have not signed an agreement with the DGA. This sometimes leads production companies that have no such agreement to form new companies, purely for the purpose of making a particular film, which do then sign an agreement with the DGA.

The Guild enters into negotiations with the AMPTP, the organization that represents the studios, networks and production companies, approximately every three years to update and renew the Basic Agreement and the Freelance Live and Tape Television Agreement, the DGA's two major agreements. The DGA negotiates minimum compensation levels that must be paid by the companies. Many DGA members have agents who may negotiate rates above the minimums for their clients. The DGA agreements also secure residual payments for the reuse of members' work in film, television and new media.

Other than wages and basic working conditions, the DGA has a particular role in protecting the creative rights of film and TV directors. Such protections that the guild provides include defining the director's role, ensuring, with examples, the principle of "one director to a picture" and the right to prepare a director's cut or edit. Generally, each of these protections is to help offset the power that producers can have over a director during the film-making process.

DGA Awards

The DGA hosts the annual DGA Awards, an important precursor to the Academy Awards. In its 69-year history, the DGA Award for Outstanding Directorial Achievement in Feature Film has been a near perfect barometer for both the Best Director, and in some cases, the Best Picture Academy Award. Only seven times has the DGA Award winner not won the corresponding Best Director Academy Award. Honorees are awarded with a statue manufactured by Society Awards.

Credits
The rule that a film can only have one single director was adopted to preserve the continuity of a director's vision and to avoid producers and actors lobbying for a director's credit, or studios hiring multiple directors for a single film or television episode.

The rule is waived only for directorial teams recognized by the DGA who have a history of working together and sharing a common vision. Examples include The Wachowskis, Jonathan Dayton and Valerie Faris, Hughes brothers, Russo Brothers, Phil Lord and Christopher Miller and the Coen brothers. The Coens for years divided credit, with Ethan taking producing credit, Joel taking directing credit, and both of them sharing the writing credit (even though the two of them shared all three duties between themselves) until The Ladykillers in 2004.

An example of the DGA refusing to recognize a directorial team was Robert Rodriguez and Frank Miller for Sin City; they were rejected because they had never worked together before; Rodriguez quit the DGA so that Miller would share director's credit.

For the film Bohemian Rhapsody, director Bryan Singer was fired due to frequent absences and clashing on the set, with Dexter Fletcher replacing him with two weeks left of filming. Singer still received director credit and Fletcher received executive producer credit.

In the past, the DGA has also engaged in disputes with the Writers Guild of America (WGA) over possessory credits, first used in the 1915 film The Birth of a Nation. The WGA tried to limit possessory credits to writers, but has always been successfully opposed by the DGA, leaving directors free to try to negotiate such credits if they wish.

Non-member directors
Not all Hollywood directors are DGA members. Notable exceptions include George Lucas and Robert Rodriguez. Quentin Tarantino directed six feature films before becoming a DGA member, in 2012. Those who are not members of the guild are unable to direct for the larger movie studios, which are signatories to the guild's agreements that all directors must be guild members.

Leadership

The following are the past Presidents of the Screen Directors Guild and the DGA:

 1936–1938 King Vidor
 1938–1941 Frank Capra
 1941–1943 George Stevens
 1943–1944 Mark Sandrich
 1944–1946 John Cromwell
 1946–1948 George Stevens
 1948–1950 George Marshall
 1950–1951 Joseph L. Mankiewicz
 1951–1959 George Sidney
 1959–1961 Frank Capra
 1961–1967 George Sidney
 1967–1971 Delbert Mann
 1971–1975 Robert Wise
 1975–1979 Robert Aldrich
 1979–1981 George Schaefer
 1981–1983 Jud Taylor
 1983–1987 Gilbert Cates
 1987–1989 Franklin J. Schaffner
 1989–1993 Arthur Hiller
 1993–1997 Gene Reynolds
 1997–2002 Jack Shea
 2002–2003 Martha Coolidge – first female president
 2003–2009 Michael Apted
 2009–2013 Taylor Hackford
 2013–2017 Paris Barclay – first black and first openly gay president
 2017–2021 Thomas Schlamme
 2021–present Lesli Linka Glatter

DGA Director's Finder Series
The Director's Finder Series (or Director's Finder Screening Series), inaugurated in December 1998, provides for the screening of independent films with no U.S. distributor, and no previous TV or other distribution. Selected by a lottery, the films are screened in DGA theatres in Los Angeles and New York City to an audience of DGA members and invited potential distributors. Many films have been picked up by distributors via the series that may not otherwise have been spotted. The series was initiated by the DGA's Independent Directors' Committee, chaired by Steven Soderbergh, initially for U.S. films only, but later expanded to include Australian, Irish, British and New Zealand directors, via the International Association of English-Speaking Directors Organisation (IAESDO). By 2007, the series had screened more than 75 films. The DGA has collaborated with organisations such as the Screen Directors Guild of Ireland (SDGI) and the Australian Directors' Guild (ADG), which nominate one film to participate.

Australian entries, selected for the Finders Series Award by the ADG from a shortlist of four, include Boxing Day (2007), directed by Kriv Stenders; and after a five-year lapse, Tony Krawitz's documentary The Tall Man (2012), and in 2014 Catriona McKenzie's Satellite Boy was selected for the series.

Irish entries include Terry McMahon's Patrick's Day (2014) and Ross Whitaker's Katie (2018).

Directors Guild Foundation
Directors Guild Foundation, founded in 1945, as Directors Guild of America Educational and Benevolent Foundation publishes the Directors Guild of America Oral History series, and provides an interest-free loan program, a Cognitive Wellness Program, and flu shot clinics.

See also

 Alan Smithee
 Runaway production
 Stage Directors and Choreographers Society

References

External links
 

 
 
Entertainment industry unions
Trade unions established in 1936
Trade unions in California
1936 establishments in California